The Solitude racetrack is a former  race circuit on public roads used for motorsport in Leonberg area, west of Stuttgart, Germany. It is named after Castle Solitude and has hosted various motorcycle and automobile races.

Routes 

This results from the start-finish-house at today's ADAC training area, on Seehaus over and then on Glemseck at Leonberg and the Steinbachsee on Katzenbacher yard, past the Stuttgart district of Büsnau to the ground and through the shadows Mahdental back to the start and finish before Glemseck. The section of the shadow base to Glemseck runs in the valley of Glemsford.

 From 1903: First hillclimb track from Stuttgart Westbahnhof up to the Schloss Solitude.
 From 1906: laid off from Westbahnhof to Heslach.
Direction: counterclockwise.
 From 1931: round course was shortened with the road through the Mahdental. Start and finish was moved to the west. Direction: clockwise.
 From 1935: Final round course: The 1931 line introduced by the 1931 Mahdental and exuberant form part of the route used by 1965  course. Direction: counterclockwise.
 Around 100-year celebration at  short route around the castle, but still at historic track parts
 2003: Start and finish back at the castle. Drive direction. Only the shortcut through the wildlife park, highway and its access ramp is new.
 2011: On the work of the initiatives Solitude-Revival and Retro Revival Classic Culture were out in the Automobile Summer 2011 in Baden-Württemberg for the 125th "Birthday" of the Benz Patent Motor Car the streets that belong to the last variant traffic, closed for the weekend. Many visitors could watch historic racing and sports cars from different eras when biking the route.

Motorcycle racing

To 50 cm ³ 
 1962: 1 Ernst Degner, Suzuki 2 Hans-Georg Anscheidt, Kreidler
 1964: 1 Ralph Bryans, Honda 2 Isao Morishita, Suzuki
 1965: 1 Ernst Degner, Suzuki 2 Hans-Georg Anscheidt, Kreidler

To 125 cc (175 cc) 
 1925: Willy zig, Puch works
 1926: 175 cc: Arthur Müller, DKW
 1927: 175 cc: Arthur Geiss, DKW
 1949: L. Vienatzer, Puch, Puch works
 1950: Ewald Kluge, DKW
 1951: Paul Hermann Müller, DKW
 1952: Werner Haas, NSU
 1953: Werner Haas, NSU
 1954: Rupert Hollaus, NSU
 1955: Karl Lottes, MV Agusta
 1956: Romolo Ferri, Gilera
 1962: Luigi Taveri, Honda
 1964: Honda Jim Redman
 1965: Ernst Degner, Suzuki

To 250 cc 
 1922: F. Frommholz, NSU
 1923: H. Schlaginweit, Paque
 1925: Josef Stelzer, BMW
 1926: Josef Stelzer, BMW
 1927: K. Scherer, NSU
 1928: Arthur Geiss, DKW
 1929: Kurt Friedrich, DKW
 1930: Otto Kohfink, Montgomery
 1931: DKW Arthur Geiss
 1935: DKW Arthur Geiss
 1936: DKW Arthur Geiss
 1937: Ewald Kluge, DKW
 1949: Otto Daiker, DKW
 1950: Hein Thorn Prikker, Moto Guzzi
 1951: Guzzi Enrico Lorenzetti, Moto
 1952: Rudi rims Heier, DKW
 1953: Otto Daiker, NSU
 1954: Werner Haas, NSU
 1955: Hans Baltisberger, NSU
 1956: Carlo Ubbiali, MV Agusta
 1959: Willy Oesterle, Maico (series machines races)
 1960: Agusta Gary Hocking, MV
 1961: Jim Redman, Honda
 1962: Honda Jim Redman
 1964: Phil Read, Yamaha (this year it was also World Champion)
 1965: Ginger Molloy, Bultaco

To 350 cc 
 1925: E. Bussinger, A.J.S.
 1926: Ms. Adam, A.J.S.
 1927: F. Franconi, Motosacoche
 1928: Friedrich Messerschmidt, BMW
 1929: Hans Soénius, BMW
 1930: Tom Bullus, NSU
 1931: Jimmie Guthrie, Norton
 1935: Werner Mellmann, NSU
 1936: Heiner Fleischmann, NSU
 1937: Heiner Fleischmann, NSU
 1949: Wilhelm heart, NSU
 1950: Heiner Fleischmann, NSU
 1951: Norton Geoff Duke
 1952: Reg Armstrong, Norton
 1953: Siegfried wishes, DKW
 1954: Ray Amm, Norton
 1955: Ken Kavanagh, Moto Guzzi – 2 Course: August Hobl, DKW
 1956: Bill Lomas Moto Guzzi – 2nd Place: August Hobl, DKW
 1964: Jim Redman, Honda

500 cc 
 1922: M. Mahlenbrei, Triumph
 1923: J. Mayer, Victoria
 1925: Rudolf Empire, BMW
 1926: Ernst Jakob Henne, BMW
 1927: Hans Thumshirn, Ardie
 1927: Hans Soénius, BMW
 1928: BMW Friedrich Messerschmidt
 1929: Hans Soénius, BMW
 1930: Tom Bullus, NSU
 1931: Jimmie Guthrie, Norton
 1935: Oscar Steinbach, NSU
 1936: Otto Ley, BMW
 1937: Kurt Mansfeld, DKW
 1949: Georg Meier, BMW
 1950: Heiner Fleischmann, NSU
 1951: Norton Geoff Duke
 1952: Reg Armstrong, Norton
 1953: Georg Meier, BMW
 1954: Geoff Duke, Gilera
 1955: Walter Zeller, BMW
 1956: Reg Armstrong, Gilera
 1960: John Surtees, MV Agusta
 1964: Mike Hailwood, MV Agusta (this year it was also World Champion)

To 750 cc 
 1925: V. King Fachsenfeld, Norton
 1926: Charles Raebel, BMW

To 1000 cm ³ 
 1925: Ernst Ißlinger, NSU
 1926: Paul Koppen, BMW
 1927: BMW Toni Bauhofer
 1928: Heck, Harley-Davidson
 1929: Josef Stelzer, BMW
 1930: Ernst Zündorf, BMW
 1931: NSU Paul Rüttchen

500/600/1000 cc sidecar 
 1925: 600 cc: Schwanberger, Norton – 1000 cc: Imholz Harley-Davidson
 1927: 600 cc: H. Eurich, D-Rad – 1000 cc: H. Dobler, New Imperial
 1928: 600 cc: Hermann Lang, Standard – 1000 cc: H. Frey, AJS
 1929: 600 cc: Hermann Lang, Standard – 1000 cc: A. Sitzberger, BMW
 1935: 600 cc: Hans Kahrmann, DKW – 1000 cc: Charles Brown / Ernst Badsching, Horex
 1936: 600 cc: Toni Babl, DKW – 1000 cc: Hans Schumann, NSU
 1937: 600 cc: Brown, DKW – 1000 cc: Zimmermann, DKW
 1949: 600 cc: Schmidt / agent Meyer, NSU – 1000 cc: Max Klankermeier / Henry Wolz, BMW
 1950: 600 cc: Hermann Boehm / Karl Fuchs, NSU – 1200 cc: Kraus / Huser, BMW
 1951: 500 cc: Ludwig Kraus / Bernard Huser, BMW – 750 cc: Eric Oliver / Lorenzo Dobelli, Norton
 1952: Cyril Smith / Bob Clements, Norton
 1953: Eric Oliver / Stanley Dibben, Norton
 1954: Wilhelm Noll / Fritz Cron, BMW
 1955: Willi fist / Karl Remmert, BMW
 1956: Wilhelm Noll / Fritz Cron, BMW
 1960: Helmut Fath / Alfred borage, BMW
 1961: Max Deubel / Emil horns, BMW
 1962: Max Deubel / Emil horns, BMW
 1964: Fritz Scheidegger / John Robinson, BMW
 1965: Max Deubel / Emil horns, BMW

Automobile races 
Automobile races were held less frequently, because the track was extended until mid-1950s wide enough. From 1961 to 1964, on the Solitude racetrack as part of motorcycle racing is not even counting for the World Cup  Formula 1 race discharged. Participants or winners here were Hans Herrmann, Innes Ireland, Jim Clark, Dan Gurney, John Surtees, Jack Brabham.

Formula I and II 
 1960 (Formula II):
 1 Wolfgang Graf Berghe von Trips, Ferrari
 2 Hans Herrmann, Porsche
 3 Joakim Bonnier, Porsche
 4 Graham Hill, Porsche
 5 Dan Gurney, Porsche
 1961 (Formula I):
 1 Innes Ireland, Lotus
 2 Joakim Bonnier, Porsche
 3 Dan Gurney, Porsche
 4 Bruce McLaren, Cooper
 5 Jack Brabham, Cooper
 6 Hans Herrmann, Porsche
 7 Jim Clark, Lotus
 8 Edgar Barth, Porsche
 9 Trevor Taylor, Lotus
 1962 (Formula I):
 1 Dan Gurney, Porsche
 2 Joakim Bonnier, Porsche
 3 Trevor Taylor, Lotus
 4 Ian Burgess, Cooper
 5 Carel Godin de Beaufort, Porsche
 6 Gerhard Mitter, Lotus
 7 Heinz Schiller, Porsche
 8 Bernard Collomb, Cooper
 1963 (Formula I):
 1 Jack Brabham, Brabham
 2 Peter Arundell, Lotus
 3 Innes Ireland, B.R.M.
 4 Lorenzo Bandini, B.R.M.
 5 Gerhard Mitter, Porsche
 6 Jim Hall, Lotus
 7 Carel Godin de Beaufort, Porsche
 8 Bob Anderson, Lola
 9 Joakim Bonnier, Cooper
 10 Mario Cabral, Cooper
 1964 (Formula I):
 1 Jim Clark, Lotus
 2 John Surtees, Ferrari
 3 Bob Anderson, Brabham
 4 Peter Revson, B.R.M.
 5 Joakim Bonnier, Brabham
 6 Trevor Taylor, B.R.M.
 7 Jo Siffert, B.R.M.
 8 Carel Godin de Beaufort, Porsche
 9 Mike Hailwood, Lotus
 10 Ernst Maring, Kuhnke / Borgward
 1965 (Formula II):
 1 Chris Amon, Lola
 2 Alan Rees, Brabham
 3 Gerhard Mitter, Brabham
 4 Peter Revson, Lotus
 5 Kurt Ahrens Jr.., Brabham
 6 Mike Beckwith, Brabham
 7 Jo Schlesser, Brabham
 8 Silvio Moser, Brabham
 9 Hans Herrmann, Lotus
 10 Eric Offenstadt, Cooper

References

Literature 
 Thomas Mehne: Racing at Solitude 1949–1965 – The Competition Cars, Petrolpics 2011, .

External links 
 Maintaining the tradition of Solitude
 Swabia prank – 100 Years of Solitude (pdf) article in MOTORCYCLE 8/2003
 Solitude racetrack, Part 1 Süddeutsche Zeitung of 1 November 2011
 Solitude racetrack, Part 2 Süddeutsche Zeitung of 1 November 2011
 Solitude racetrack, part 3 Süddeutsche Zeitung of 1 November 2011

References 

Defunct motorsport venues in Germany
Sports venues in Baden-Württemberg
Buildings and structures in Stuttgart